Dolf van den Brink (born 1973) is the Chief Executive Officer and Chairman of the Executive Board at Heineken N.V.

Career
Dolf van den Brink is the Chief Executive Officer and Chairman of the Executive Board at Heineken N.V. since 1 June 2020.
He succeeded Jean-François van Boxmeer. Prior to this Dolf van den Brink  was President of the Asia Pacific region and member of the Executive Team at Heineken N.V.

References

1973 births
Living people
Heineken people
Dutch chief executives in the food industry
University of Groningen alumni
Dutch expatriates in the United States
Henry Crown Fellows